The 2002 World Weightlifting Championships were held in Warsaw, Poland from November 18 to November 26, 2002.

Medal summary

Men

Women

Medal table
Ranking by Big (Total result) medals 

Ranking by all medals: Big (Total result) and Small (Snatch and Clean & Jerk)

Team ranking

Men

Women

Participating nations
285 competitors from 54 nations competed.

 (2)
 (2)
 (1)
 (4)
 (4)
 (2)
 (6)
 (7)
 (13)
 (1)
 (7)
 (1)
 (15)
 (7)
 (5)
 (2)
 (2)
 (3)
 (1)
 (4)
 (6)
 (4)
 (7)
 (4)
 (5)
 (3)
 (11)
 (1)
 (9)
 (1)
 (8)
 (2)
 (1)
 (1)
 (8)
 (12)
 (7)
 (5)
 (1)
 (1)
 (2)
 (1)
 (14)
 (5)
 (14)
 (5)
 (15)
 (2)
 (3)
 (1)
 (12)
 (3)
 (13)
 (9)

References
Results (Sport 123)
Weightlifting World Championships Seniors Statistics 
IWF Archive

 
World Weightlifting Championships
World Weightlifting Championships
Weightlifting
Sports competitions in Warsaw
World Weightlifting Championships
World Weightlifting Championships
World Weightlifting Championships, 2002